Beneath the Raven Moon is a studio album by Native American flautist Mary Youngblood, released in February 2002 through the record label Silver Wave. In 2003, the album earned Youngblood the Grammy Award for Best Native American Music Album.

Composition
Allmusic described "Within My Heart" and "Dream with Me" as "straightforward Native compositions" and "Walk with Me" as having a "gentle, jazzy shuffle".

Reception
Noting the fusion between Native American music with other genres, Allmusic said of the album: "Youngblood and her band mates manage to slip in and out of genres without losing their Native spirit, and doubtless attracting an ever-wider audience."

Track listing

Track listing adapted from Allmusic.

Personnel
 Anne Beer – violin
 Tito la Rosa – quena
 James Marienthal – executive producer, piano
 Mark McCoin – drums, hand drums, percussion
 Valerie Sanford – cover art, design
 Ray Wasinger – drums
 Tom Wasinger – banjo, bass, berimbau, bowed zither, cajon, chamberlin, cittern, guitar, hand drums, keyboards, lap steel guitar, mandolin, marxophone, mountain dulcimer, mouth bow, percussion, producer, string arrangements, ukulele, zither
 Mary Youngblood – Celtic flute, flute, Native American flute, poetry, producer, vocals, wood flute

Credits adapted from Allmusic.

References

External links

 Mary Youngblood's official site

2002 albums
Grammy Award for Best Native American Music Album
Mary Youngblood albums
World music albums by American artists